Homelessness is a serious issue throughout the state of New Mexico. Through a demographic examination it becomes evident that New Mexico has a high proportion of ethnographies that are currently and historically socioeconomically disadvantaged. Native Americans as a proportion of the US population represent the second highest amongst all States with only Alaska having a higher ratio, while it also has a large Hispanic population. Homelessness is a direct cause from an individual not being able to provide themselves with the most basic of necessities to maintain a healthy life hence having a higher proportion of individuals in poverty places a greater risk of an individual becoming homeless.

New Mexico's homeless population is largely concentrated in Albuquerque, although homeless populations generally exist on a marginally lower scale in Santa Fe and Las Cruces.

Cost and utilization of services
According to a 2018 Las Cruces-based study into cost of homelessness on the state government of New Mexico concluded that, on a per nightly basis, emergency shelter costs $30; supportive housing $33, state penitentiary $77, Santa Fe County Detention Centre $82, St Vincent Hospital $550 and UNM Hospital $71. Homelessness by and large is caused by or as a result of health care complications. One need only consider ailments such as addiction, psychological disorders, HIV/AIDS and an array of other ailments that require consistent long-term care that cannot be well managed in an unsafe, unpredictable environment that confronts most homeless.

Inability to adequately manage these medical problems places a further economic burden on the state as the frequency and duration of hospital visits may increase. This phenomenon is evidenced by the fact that on average homeless spent four days longer than comparable non-homeless, costing the State approximately $2,414 per hospitalization. Homelessness causes both serious mental and physical anguish as evidenced by the fact that a homeless person's psychiatric hospitalization rate is 100 times more than their non-homeless compatriot.

Loitering and panhandling laws
Due to New Mexico's strong laws against loitering, sleeping in cars and begging (traits a lot of homeless people are forced to do) they are disproportionately over-represented in the prison system. Police officials can accuse any person they believe may have attempted to disrupt the peace, regardless of whether or not the offense presents danger to the community. Panhandling is an umbrella term that represents begging, sponging and spanging. In the state of New Mexico there are strict regulations on panhandling. Moreover, homeless people are prohibited to beg after dark and if they do they are often sent to jail. In an attempt to remove homeless people from the streets, it is common for the police to dispose of their property.  The above conditions cause the mere act of being homeless to become a self-perpetuating cycle of crime.

Albuquerque/Bernalillo County
Albuquerque has 4-5,000 homeless people, much of whom are concentrated off Central Avenue in the International District.  The International District, nicknamed the War Zone, is the center of Albuquerque's homelessness and cirme issues. In 2009, residents who resented the War Zone name persuaded city leaders to officially re-brand the area as the International District, highlighting its diverse community rather than crime. The first International Festival was held later that year. Despite these changes, crime has continued to be an issue in the neighborhood. In 2017, the Journal reported that it was "the most violent place in the city in the past three years and is home to both victims and suspects." Between 2014 and 2016, 10% of addresses in the neighborhood reported a violent crime, and 25% reported a property crime. One business in the neighborhood reported 98 violent crimes during that period. In 2018, the International District was ranked as the worst neighborhood in New Mexico for the health and well-being of young children.

Like many major American cities, Albuquerque has struggled with a homelessness issue that became more visibly problematic since the 2000s. According to Rock at Noon Day, a homeless services center, there were an estimated 4-5,000 homeless living in the Albuquerque metropolitan area as of 2019. Albuquerque Public Schools spokeswoman Monica Armenta said the number of homeless kids enrolled in district schools, meaning children from families that have no permanent address, has consistently ranged from 3,200 to 3,500. The Coordinated Entry System, a centralized citywide system that the city uses to track and fill supportive housing openings when they become available, shows that about 5,000 households experienced homelessness last year. The International District, off Central Avenue, has a serious issue with blight and homelessness. Fentanyl and methamphetamine use is visible and a serious social issue in the International District, as well as some areas adjacent to Nob Hill and Downtown.

Count
Due to the 2012 Point in Time count taking place in January, where weather, while sunny and dry, is still frigid and cold, the number of homeless individuals on the streets and to be visibly seen is lower than what would counted in the autumn, spring or summertime. According to the nonprofit homeless rights and services coalition, The New Mexico Coalition to End Homelessness says there were more than 1,300 people living on the streets of Albuquerque (0.3% of the city's population) in January 2022, but according to their more recent data that number has grown. The nonprofit says that number has grown to more than 2,800 homeless people with 21% or more than 600 of them coming from outside of the state.

References

Housing in New Mexico
New Mexico